Leucanopsis liparoides is a moth of the family Erebidae. It was described by Walter Rothschild in 1909. It is found in Suriname, Peru and Brazil.

References

liparoides
Moths described in 1909